Strawberry is a 2015 Indian Tamil horror comedy film written and directed by Pa. Vijay, who also played the lead role in it. The film also stars Avani Modi, Samuthirakani, Yuvina Parthavi, Devayani and Robo Shankar The soundtrack was composed by Taj Noor. The film released in theatres on 11 September 2015.

Cast 

 Pa. Vijay as Sarvanan
 Yuvina Parthavi as Anu
 Avani Modi as Milovina
 Samuthirakani as Aadhi
 Devayani as Aadhi's wife
 Joe Malloori as D'Souza
 Robo Shankar as Arnold, Saravanan's companion
 Thambi Ramaiah as Arnold's friend
 Jangiri Madhumitha as D'Sousa's daughter
 Kavithalaya Krishnan as Naidu
 Imman Annachi as teashop owner 
 Mayilsamy as Swamiji
 Vettri as Vikram Chand
 Vishwa Vijay as bus kid
 Mohammad Javid
 Sarathy Arumugam

Release
The satellite rights of the film were sold to Sun TV.

Critical reception 
The Hindu wrote, "The problem is that the nobility of Vijay's motive isn't really backed by any serious exploration of the business of education. The story may have perhaps germinated from this idea, but the film takes such a long time to get to this point that "lessons" at the end seem like an afterthought — and a manipulative afterthought at that". The Times of India gave the film 2 stars out of 5 and wrote, "Strawberry could have been mildly engaging if only it had released some five years ago. Given the amount of horror films that Tamil movie audiences have been exposed to during this period, the film feels utterly redundant. The filmmaking, too, isn't interesting, and depends on done-to-death cliches — moody skies, pouring rain, tacky visual effects and high-pitched music, supported by bland performances". Sify wrote, "to be frank, the one-liner of Strawberry is definitely interesting but for an engaging watch, a film needs something called water-tight writing and strong characterizations which the director has sadly missed out! The film is highly amateurish and is unbearable as the director tries to make it a social tear jerker".

Rediff gave 3 out of 5 as well and wrote, "Despite the lack of scary moments, the uninspiring computer graphics and cliché-ridden climax, a decent storyline and some good performances make lyricist Pa Vijay's Strawberry worth a watch". The New Indian Express wrote, "Strawberry can be considered as a debutant maker's promising work". Indiaglitz gave 2.5 out of 5 for the film, praising the acting of Yuvina Parthavi while criticising the score, special effects and dialogue of the climax.

Soundtrack
The soundtrack was composed by Taj Noor. Unnikrishnan's daughter Uthara had lent her voice for a song.

References

External links
 

2015 comedy horror films
2015 films
2015 horror films
Indian comedy horror films
2010s Tamil-language films
2015 directorial debut films
2015 comedy films